Mwenge may refer to:

 Mwenge, Uganda
 Mwenge, Dar es Salaam
 mwenge bigere, Ugandan beverage